William P. Robinson House is a historic home located near Lexington, Lafayette County, Missouri.  It was built about 1850, and is a two-story, central passage plan, Greek Revival style brick I-house. It has a two-story rear ell with an enclosed two-story porch.

It was listed on the National Register of Historic Places in 1997.

References

Houses on the National Register of Historic Places in Missouri
Greek Revival houses in Missouri
Houses completed in 1850
Houses in Lafayette County, Missouri
National Register of Historic Places in Lafayette County, Missouri
1850 establishments in Missouri